James King (born 16 March 1987) is a rugby union player. His regular playing position is lock.

King was born in Pukekohe, New Zealand. He previously represented the Rebels 
and the Blues in Super Rugby. In 2014 King left the Rebels for a contract in Japan, playing for the Yakult Levins.

The King debuted for the United States national rugby union team at the 2016 Americas Rugby Championship. He qualified through his American mother.

References

External links 
Rebels profile
itsrugby.co.uk profile

1987 births
Living people
American rugby union players
Blues (Super Rugby) players
Expatriate rugby union players in Australia
Melbourne Rebels players
New Zealand expatriate rugby union players
New Zealand expatriate sportspeople in Australia
New Zealand rugby union players
North Harbour rugby union players
Rugby union locks
Rugby union players from the Auckland Region
United States international rugby union players